Upendra Nath Nayak is a politician from Odisha, India. He represented Keonjhar (Lok Sabha constituency) during the 12th Lok Sabha. He represented as a candidate of Bharatiya Janata Party.

References

Lok Sabha members from Odisha
People from Kendujhar district
People from Odisha
Bharatiya Janata Party politicians from Odisha
India MPs 1998–1999
Living people
Year of birth missing (living people)